The Canadian Philosophical Association (CPA;  []) was founded in 1958 as a bilingual non-profit organization to promote philosophical scholarship and education across Canada, and to represent the interests of the profession in public forums. It publishes a quarterly journal, Dialogue: Canadian Philosophical Review. All activities and publications are bilingual. As of 2021, the association numbers over 600 active members. 

Past presidents of the society include Luc Langlois, David Braybrooke, Kai Nielsen, William Sweet, Ronald de Sousa, Adèle Mercier, Thomas De Koninck, Sandra Lapointe, Samantha Brennan, Daniel Weinstock, Dominic McIver Lopes and Christine Tappolet. The current president is Jennifer Nagel of the University of Toronto.

The administrative offices are located in Toronto.

Presidents 

 1958–1961 Jean Langlois
 1962 A. H. Johnston
 1963–1966 A. R. C. Duncan
 1967 L. Martinelli
 1968 T. Penelhum
 1969 J. Wojciechowski
 1970 E. Trépannier
 1971 David Braybrooke
 1972 
 1973 John W. Yolton
 1974 J. Plamondon
 1975 Francis Sparshott
 1976 N. Lacharité
 1977 John King-Farlow
 1978 Venant Cauchy
 1979 A. McKinnon
 1980 Guy Lafrance
 1981 Joseph Owens
 1982 
 1983 Kai Nielsen
 1984 Pierre Laberge
 1985 Sarah Shorten
 1986 Nicolas Kaufmann
 1987 John Trentman
 1988 Robert Nadeau
 1989 Robert Butts
 1990 
 1991 Michael McDonald
 1992 Maurice Gagnon
 1993 Ann MacKenzie
 1994 
 1995 Wesley Cragg
 1996 Serge Robert
 1997 Frank Cunningham
 1998 
 1999 Steven Davis
 2000 Thomas De Koninck
 2001 Andrew Brook
 2002 Paul Dumouchel
 2003 John Thorp
 2004 Philippe Constantineau
 2005 Gerard Naddaf
 2006 Luc Langlois
 2007 William Sweet
 2008 Jocelyne Couture
 2009 Bryson Brown
 2010 Denis Fisette
 2011 Ronald de Sousa
 2012 Adèle Mercier
 2013 Adam Morton
 2014 Frédéric Bouchard
 2015 Tim Kenyon

See also 

 Philosophy in Canada

References

External links 
 

1958 establishments in Canada
Organizations established in 1958
Philosophical societies in Canada